Christmas Turkey is a Christmas-themed album released in 1997 by the Canadian comedy music group The Arrogant Worms.  It includes a re-recorded version of "The Christmas Song" (which appeared on their debut album).

Track listing

The Arrogant Worms albums
1997 Christmas albums
Christmas albums by Canadian artists